Chotiari Dam is an artificial water reservoir situated 35 km away from the Sanghar town in Sanghar District, Sindh, Pakistan. Its construction was completed in December 2002, at the total cost of Rs 6 billion. The main purpose of constructing this dam is to discharge saline water of the Left Bank Outfall Drain (LBOD). It has an active capacity of 0.67 MAF.

Before the construction of the reservoir, this site was home to a few natural lakes, fed by tributaries of the Nara Canal. It is also a wetland and habitat for birds, reptiles and small mammals. Now the environment and wildlife of this area is badly affected by the saline water discharge of Left Bank Outfall Drain (LBOD).

References

Dams in Sindh
Dams in Pakistan
Sanghar District
Dams completed in 2002
2002 establishments in Pakistan